Treaty 11, the last of the Numbered Treaties, was an agreement established between 1921 and 1922 between King George V and various First Nation band governments in what is today the Northwest Territories.

Henry Anthony Conroy was appointed treaty commissioner and conducted the negotiations and signings in 1921. However, he was unable to gain signatures from some bands in the Liard district during that summer. Further complicating matters was Conroy's death in April 1922. Thomas William Harris, the Indian Agent at Fort Simpson, Conroy's replacement, conducted the remaining treaty signings at Liard in July 1922. The signatories included Bishop Gabriel-Joseph-Elie Breynat of the Apostolic Vicariate of Mackenzie.

The boundary between Treaty 8 and Treaty 11 is ambiguous. The Yellowknives Dene First Nation is a signatory to Treaty 8, but according to the text of the treaties the Yellowknife Nation's territory, known as Chief Drygeese Territory, is within Treaty 11.

Timeline
 27 June 1921: Fort Providence signing
 11 July 1921: Fort Simpson signing
 13 July 1921: Fort Wrigley signing
 15 July 1921: Fort Norman signing
 21 July 1921: Good Hope signing
 26 July 1921: Arctic Red River signing
 28 July 1921: Fort McPherson signing
 22 August 1921: Fort Rae signing
 27 April 1922: treaty commissioner Henry Anthony Conroy dies
 17 July 1922: Liard signing under new commissioner Harris

List of Treaty 11 First Nations

Acho Dene Koe First Nation
Aklavik First Nation
Behdzi Ahda' First Nation
Dechi Laot'i First Nations
Deh Gáh Got'ı̨ę First Nation
Délı̨nę First Nation
Dog Rib Rae First Nation
Fort Good Hope First Nation
Gameti First Nation
Gwichya Gwich'in First Nation
Inuvik Native Band
Jean Marie River First Nation
Ka'a'gee Tu First Nation
Łı́ı́dlı̨ı̨ Kų́ę́ First Nation
Nahɂą Dehé Dene Band
Pehdzeh Ki First Nation
Sambaa K'e First Nation
Tetlit Gwich'in First Nation
Tulita Dene First Nation
West Point First Nation
Wha Ti First Nation

See also
 Numbered Treaties
 The Canadian Crown and Aboriginal peoples

References

External links

Treaty Texts - Treaty No. 11 from the Government of Canada

Treaty 11 NWT Historical Timeline, Prince of Wales Northern Heritage Centre
 Treaty 11 photograph of the treaty. Further down the page are pictures of Chief Jimmy Bruneau, one of the original signatories, in his Treaty Suit.
 Treaty 11 area map

Numbered Treaties
Treaties concluded in 1922